Angeles Comsbmra is a football club in the Mexican football league system Segunda División Profesional in Puebla, Puebla, Mexico. The club is owned by the company, Comercializadora Mexicana Servicios, Bienes Médicos, Recursos, Administrativos

History
The club was founded in 2007 when COMSBMRA, Inc. bought, with Ángeles de COMBSMRA y Ángeles de Tlahuac from the Tercera División de México, a second division franchise.

See also
Football in Mexico

External links
COMSBMRA INC Official page 
Mexican Football League Second Division Official Website 

Football clubs in Puebla
Association football clubs established in 2007
2007 establishments in Mexico